Dewar's is a brand of blended Scotch whisky produced by Bacardi in Scotland.

History
The Dewar's whisky brand was created by John Dewar, Sr. in 1846. Under the control of his two sons, John A. Dewar Jr. and Thomas "Tommy" Dewar, the brand expanded to become a global market leader by 1896 and began to win several awards, including a gold medal in the 1904 St. Louis World's Fair. Tommy became famous as the author of a travel journal, Ramble Round the Globe, which documented his travels while publicizing the Dewar name. Dewar's eventually expanded their product by constructing the Aberfeldy Distillery in 1896.

The company joined Distillers Company in 1925. Distillers was acquired by Guinness in 1986, and Guinness merged with Grand Metropolitan to form Diageo in 1997. Diageo sold Dewar's to Bacardi the next year.

Dewar's rose to prominence in the United States when Andrew Carnegie requested a small keg of Dewar's Scotch whisky be sent to the White House for President James Garfield's inauguration. Carnegie also sent the same gift to President Benjamin Harrison on his inauguration eight years later.

In 1987, numerous cases of still perfect Dewar's Scotch were recovered by underwater archaeologist E. Lee Spence from the shipwreck of the SS Regina, which sank in Lake Huron in 1913.

Notable processes
Dewar's pioneered the process of "marrying" the whisky in oak casks to allow the blend to age as one within the casks. After the blend is created, the whisky is returned to an oak cask and aged even further to obtain a smooth, robust finish.

Dewar's products
Dewar's White Label – Created in 1899 by John Dewar & Son's first Master Blender, A.J. Cameron. It has become the company's top-selling variation.
Dewar's 12 – 12 years old. The blend was created by Dewar's sixth master blender, Tom Aitken. This offering has received some awards at international Spirit ratings competitions.  From the San Francisco World Spirits Competition, it has received several double gold, gold and silver medals.
Dewar's 15 – 15 years old. The blend was created by the current, and first female, Dewar's Master Blender Stephanie Macleod.
Dewar's 18 – 18 years old. First released in 2003 and created by Master Blender Tom Aitken. 
Dewar's 19 – 19 years old Champion Edition created by Master Blender Stephanie Macleod; released and retired in the same year, 2021.
Dewar's Signature – First created in 2003 by Master Blender Tom Aitken.
Dewar's Scratched Cask – Released in 2015, Dewar's Scratched Cask used the process of charring and scratching ex-bourbon barrels to release a smoother, American-inspired richness to Dewar's White Label Blended Scotch Whisky. Retired circa 2020.
Dewar's Caribbean Smooth Rum Cask Finish 8 Year	- Released in 2019.
Dewar's Ilegal Smooth Mezcal Cask Finish 8 Year - Released in 2020.
Dewar's Portuguese Smooth Port Cask Finish 8 Year - Released in 2021.
Dewar's Japanese Smooth Mizunara Oak Cask Finish 8 Year - Released in 2021.
Dewar's French Smooth Apple Spirit (Calvados) Cask Finish 8 Year - Released in 2021.

Distilleries

Dewar's parent company, John Dewar & Sons, Ltd., owns five whisky distilleries in Scotland:
Aberfeldy
Aultmore 
Craigellachie
Macduff 
Royal Brackla

Advertising
The premier rugby union competition in Victoria, Australia, the Dewar Shield, is named after the company. The Shield, which is the oldest continuous rugby competition in Australia, was donated by the company to the Victorian Rugby Union upon its inauguration in 1909.
Dewar's has run television advertisements featuring Irish actor Michael Fassbender.
Dewar's created the first motion picture advertisement, "It's Scotch!", in 1898.
Dewar's was the first Scotch whisky company to use virtual reality video for a product launch for Dewar's Scratched Cask. The VR video, titled "Dewar's Scratched 360", features brand ambassador Gabriel Cardarella touring the various locations in Scotland that are crucial to the process of creating Dewar's Scratched Cask.

References

Notes

Further reading

External links
 
 Homepage of Dewar's Aberfeldy Distillery
 Dr. Whisky on Dewar's

Bacardi
Blended Scotch whisky
Scottish brands
Clan Dewar
Products introduced in 1846
1846 establishments in Scotland
Food and drink companies established in 1846